The 1954 Kategoria e Dytë was the 10th season of a second-tier Association football league in Albania. The season started in March and ended in August. The Second Division 1954 sees the participation of 48 teams divided into 8 groups, whose winners play the second phase in 2 groups of four. The first two classified play the final for the division title and are promoted together with the second of the two final groups, but instead of the team of the Physical Education Technical School Vojo Kushi from Tirana, the Tekstilisti "Stalin" Yzberish from the capital is admitted to the First Division. Dinamo Shkodër wins the division champion title by beating Puna Gjirokastër in the final.

First round

Group 1 

Dinamo Shkodër won the group and advanced to the next round

Group 2 

Physical Education Technical School Vojo Kushi won the group and advanced to the next round

Group 3 

Puna Fier won the group and advanced to the next round

Group 4 

Puna Peqin won the group and advanced to the next round

Group 5 

Puna Gjirokastër won the group and advanced to the next round

Group 6 

Spartaku Pogradec won the group and advanced to the next round

Group 7 

Puna Shijak won the group and advanced to the next round

Group 8 

Puna Berat won the group and advanced to the next round

Second round

Group 1

Group 2

Final 
Single match played in Durrës.

 Dinamo Shkodër, Puna Gjirokastër, Puna Berat and Tekstilisti "Stalin" Yzberish were promoted to 1955 National Championship.

Notes

References

Kategoria e Parë seasons
Albania
2